Saran Shakthi (born 5 May 1997) is an Indian actor who primarily works in Tamil films. He made his film debut as a child artist in Kadal (2013). Saran was a contestant in the television reality show Survivor Tamil 1 and was announced as the runner-up of the season.

Career
Saran first appeared in K. Balachander's serial Amudha Oru Aacharyakuri aired on Kalaignar TV (2012–2013). His film debut as a child artist is in the movie Kadal (2013) directed by Mani Ratnam. He also played child artist in various other films such as Jilla (2014), Rummy (2014), Sigaram Thodu (2014), and Vai Raja Vai (2015).

Saran gained recognition and breakthrough for his role as Kanna in Vada Chennai (2018). He starred in his first lead role in Sagaa (2019), which opened to mixed reviews. Starred alongside Nayanthara in Netrikann (2021) a crime thriller. He played a negative role in Etharkkum Thunindhavan (2022), and an impactful role in K.G.F: Chapter 2, his Kannada film debut.

Television
Saran participated in the TV reality show Survivor Tamil (2021) on Zee Tamil and was announced as the runner up of the season.

Filmography

Film
 All films in Tamil, unless otherwise noted

Television

References

External links
 

Indian actors
1997 births
Indian male film actors
Male actors in Tamil cinema
Male actors in Kannada cinema
21st-century Indian male actors
Living people